Bothynotus is a genus of true bugs belonging to the family Miridae. The species of this genus are found in Europe and North America.

Species
The following species are recognised in the genus Bothynotus:

Bothynotus albonotatus 
Bothynotus albus 
Bothynotus barberi 
Bothynotus caruaruensis 
Bothynotus castaneus 
Bothynotus floridanus 
Bothynotus impunctatus 
Bothynotus johnstoni 
Bothynotus mexicanus 
Bothynotus modestus 
Bothynotus morimotoi 
Bothynotus pilosus 
Bothynotus schaffneri 
Bothynotus sulinus

References

Miridae